This article lists events from the year 2018 in the Bahamas.

Incumbents
Monarch: Elizabeth II
 Governor-General: Marguerite Pindling 
 Prime Minister: Hubert Minnis

Events
 21 December – The 2018 Bahamas Bowl

Deaths

24 February – Durward Knowles, sailor, Olympic champion (b. 1917).

28 June – Elisha Obed, boxer (b. 1951).

See also
List of years in the Bahamas

References

Links

 
2010s in the Bahamas
Years of the 21st century in the Bahamas
Bahamas
Bahamas